Nader Mohammed Kara (born 19 January 1980) is a Libyan football attacker who, as of 2006/2007 season is playing for Al Ahly Tripoli. Having received offers to play abroad, by the Bahraini and Turkish national leagues, he decided instead to remain in Libya, instead moving to Al- Ahly Tripoli from Al Olympic Zaouia.

He was a member of the Libyan 2006 African Nations Cup team, who finished bottom of their group in the first round of competition, thus failing to secure qualification for the quarter-finals, finishing with just one point from their three matches

Clubs
 Al Olympic Zaouia
 Al Ahly Tripoli
 Al Ahed

External links

1980 births
Living people
Libyan footballers
Libya international footballers
2006 Africa Cup of Nations players
Association football forwards
Al Ahed FC players
Olympic Azzaweya SC players
Libyan Premier League players
Libyan expatriate footballers
Lebanese Premier League players